Guido Morselli (August 15, 1912 – July 30, 1973) was an Italian novelist and essayist.

Life
Morselli was born in Bologna, the second son of a well-to-do family belonging to Bolognese bourgeoisie. Giovanni, his father, was a manager of Carlo Erba, a pharmaceutical firm, while his mother, Olga Vincenzi, was the daughter of one of the most prestigious lawyers in Bologna. The family moved to Milan in 1914. Morselli's childhood was quite serene, but his mother suffered from Spanish flu in 1922 and had to be committed to hospital for a long time.

The absence of his mother had a strong impact on Guido's personality, also due to his father's frequent travels; when Olga died in 1924, the loss struck the twelve-year-old boy powerfully. The relations between Guido and his father, who was often away from home, deteriorated. Guido developed a restless, unsociable character; he did not like school, though he was quite brilliant and loved reading.

Guido failed his final secondary school exams in 1930 at the Liceo Parini, and barely managed to pass them in the following year. He studied law at the Università Statale di Milano to please his authoritarian father, but he started writing short journalistic essays without even trying to have them published.

After his graduation in 1935, he served in the Italian Army, attending the officer course for the Alpini corps. He then was sent to an infantry regiment in Milan. Subsequently, he lived for a long time abroad (1936–37), writing reportages and short stories which remain unpublished. His father strived to push Guido towards a managerial career, and had him hired at Caffaro (a chemical company) as a promoter. This experience only lasted one year, and it worsened the relations between father and son. After the death of his beloved sister Luisa in 1938, Guido managed to obtain life income from his father which enabled him to devote himself to those activities he really loved: reading, researching, and writing. He kept writing short essays, and began a diary, which he continued till his death.

All his novels and essays were posthumously published after Morselli committed suicide in 1973.

Themes
Morselli is an eclectic author whose oeuvre contains specimens of different genres. While Il comunista is a solid realistic novel which analyses the existential crisis of a Communist Party cadre in the 1960s, Past Conditional belongs to the genre of alternate histories, inasmuch as it tells the counterfactual story of how the Austrian Empire won the Great War (by defeating Italy using blitzkrieg tactics well before their time). Dissipatio HG is a surrealistic fantasy novel where humankind disappears leaving its cities behind; only the narrator remains, and he wanders between Italy and Switzerland, contemplating the empty cities; Roma senza papa was clearly written in the wake of Vatican Council II, as it describes what happens in Rome once a radical reformist Pope has left it, because he considers the city too corrupt to host a religious and spiritual authority. All his novels have a very strong philosophical side, and his characters often present readers with deep and complex meditations on history, religion, politics, etc. However, Michele Mari has underscored the importance of solitude in Morselli's oeuvre, which somewhat mirrors his real personality.

Literary Award
The "Premio Guido Morselli" was established in 2008 by Professor Silvio Raffo and Ms Linda Terziroli. The Literary Award takes place annually and is spread over several months, consisting in a series of conferences concerning Morselli's work and the final ceremony. It usually takes place between Varese, where Morselli spent most of his life, and Switzerland.

Works

Fiction

Roma senza papa: Cronache romane di fine secolo ventesimo, Milan, 1974;
Past Conditional: A Retrospective Hypothesis (Contro-passato prossimo: Un'ipotesi retrospettiva, 1975), tr. Hugh Shankland, 1989;
Divertimento 1889 (Divertimento 1889, 1975), tr. Hugh Shankland, 1986;
Il comunista,  Milan, 1976; The Communist, tr. Frederika Randall, 2017;
Dissipatio H.G., Milan, 1977; Dissipatio H.G.: The Vanishing, tr. Frederika Randall, 2020;
Un dramma borghese, Milan, 1978;
Incontro col comunista, Milan, 1980;
Uomini e amori, Milan, 1998.

Essays
Proust o del sentimento, Milan, 1943;
Realismo e fantasia, Milan, 1947;
Fede e critica, Milan, 1977;
Diario, Ed. V. Fortichiari, Milan, 1988.
La felicità non è un lusso, Milan, 1994.
Una rivolta e altri scritti, Milan, 2013.

Secondary Literature
 Costa, Simona, Guido Morselli, Firenze, La Nuova Italia, 1981
 Lessona Fasano, Marina, Guido Morselli. Un inspiegabile caso letterario, Liguori, 2003
 Fiorentino, Maria, Guido Morselli tra critica e narrativa, Graus Editore, 2002
 Fortichiari, V., Invito alla lettura di Morselli, Mursia, Milano 1984
 Aa.Vv. "Ipotesi su Morselli", Autografo, No. 37, 1998.
 Pietrangeli, Fabio, "Guido Morselli: l’impronta umana e i “trascorsi eruditi”", in La Scrittura, No. 4, 1996-1997.
 Coletti, Vittorio, "Guido Morselli", in Otto/Novecento, No. 5, 1978.
 Parmeggiani, Francesca, "Morselli e il tempo", in Annali d’Italianistica, No. 19, 2001.
 Gaudio, Alessandro, "In partibus infidelium. Guido Morselli uomo di fiction e di precisione", Filologia antica e moderna, Year 32, 2007.
 Rinaldi, Rinaldo, "I romanzi a una dimensione di G. Morselli", I tempi del rinnovamento. Atti del convegno internazionale «Rinnovamento del codice narrativo in Italia dal 1945 al 1992», vol. I, Rome-Leuven, Bulzoni – Leuven University Press, 1995, pp. 471–499.
 Mariani, Carlo, "Guido Morselli", in Studi novecenteschi, No. 41, Year 18, 1991.
 Atti del convegno su Guido Morselli: dieci anni dopo 1973-1983, Gavirate, 1984
 Guido Morselli: i percorsi sommersi. Inediti, immagini, documenti, Eds. Elena Borsa and Sara D’Arienzo, Novara, Interlinea, 1998
 Villani, Paola, Il caso Morselli: il registro filosofico-letterario, Napoli, ESI, 1998
 Bruno, Pischedda, "Morselli: una “Dissipatio” molto postmoderna", Filologia antica e moderna, No. 19, 2000, pp. 163–189.
 Rinaldi, Rinaldo, "Mors-Morselli", Transalpina, 2001, pp. 129–142
 Tuccillo, Fulvio, "L’infelicità del vivere e la felicità della scrittura: i saggi di Guido Morselli", Riscontri, 2007, Nos. 2-3, pp. 47–55
 Mattei, Paolo, "Una lettura de Il Comunista", Sincronie, 2003, No. 14, pp. 55–76
 Baldini, Anna, "Le ragioni dell'inattualità. Il comunista di Morselli e La giornata di uno scrutatore di Calvino", Allegoria, No. 50-51, 2005, pp. 191–203
 Mezzina, Domenico, "Dalla chiaroveggenza intellettuale alla "frana morale": Un dramma borghese di Guido Morselli", Critica Letteraria, No. 3, 2008, pp. 493–524
 Terziroli, Linda, "Lettere ritrovate", "Nuova Editrice Magenta", Varese, 2009
 Mussgnug, Florian, "No new Earth: Apocalyptic Rhetoric in Italian Nuclear-war Literature", Beyond Catholicism, Edited Fabrizio De Donno and Simon Gilson, 2014.

See also
Maria Corti

References

External links
An article on italica.rai.it
Life and works on italialibri.net

Italian science fiction writers
1973 deaths
1912 births
20th-century Italian novelists
20th-century Italian male writers
Italian male novelists
1973 suicides
Suicides by firearm in Italy